The 2008–2009 Israeli Final Four , the fourth Israeli Final Four was held at Yad Eliyahu Arena, Tel Aviv, Israel on 19 and 21 May 2009 to determine the winner of the 2008–2009 Israeli League. The contestants were Maccabi Tel Aviv, the 2007–08 Israeli League runner-up, Hapoel Jerusalem, Maccabi Haifa, the 2008–09 Israeli State Cup runner-up and Gilboa/Galil. Maccabi Tel Aviv won their 48th Israeli League crown, beating Maccabi Haifa 85-72 in the final.

Venue
The Yad Eliyahu Arena is an indoor sports arena in Tel Aviv, Israel. Opened in 1963 with its seating capacity varying from 5,000 to 11,700, it had hosted the 1971–1972 FIBA European Champions Cup final, the 1993–1994 FIBA European Championship Final Four, the 2003–2004 Euroleague Final Four, the 2005-2006 Israeli Final Four, the 2006-2007 Israeli Final Four and the 2007-2008 Israeli Final Four.

Bracket

Semifinals
All times are in Israel Summer Time.

Semifinal 1

Semifinal 2

Third-place playoff

Final

Awards
Carlos Arroyo – Final MVP

1